368th may refer to:

368th Bombardment Squadron, inactive United States Air Force unit
368th Expeditionary Air Support Operations Group (368 EASOG) is a support unit of the United States Air Force
368th Fighter Group or 136th Airlift Wing, unit of the Texas Air National Guard, stationed at Naval Air Station Joint Reserve Base Fort Worth
368th Fighter Squadron or 165th Airlift Squadron, unit of the Kentucky Air National Guard 123d Airlift Wing located at Louisville Air National Guard Base
368th Military Intelligence Battalion (United States) meet the operational intelligence requirements of Combatant Commands and the United States Intelligence Community

See also
368 (number)
368, the year 368 (CCCLXVIII) of the Julian calendar
368 BC